The Dewar Cup circuit   was a series tour of British indoor tennis tournaments sponsored by the Scottish whisky firm of Dewar's from 1965 to 1976.

History

The Dewar Cup circuit  were held continuously throughout the autumn, normally October through to November each of the individual events were stand alone tournaments, but formed part of a particular leg of the tour for that season e.g. first leg, second leg, third leg and fourth leg. The tournaments featured both men's and women's singles and doubles and mixed doubles competition awarding prize money, players were also awarded qualifying points for the climax of the tour, and were staged as the Dewar Cup Finals, initially held at the Crystal Palace, London for the first two years, they then moved,moved to the Royal Albert Hall in 1970 through till 1976, by which time the circuit had declined to the one main event for 1975 and 1976.

Circuit tournaments

Dewar Cup Aberavon
Dewar Cup Billingham
Dewar Cup Cardiff
Dewar Cup Edinburgh
Dewar Cup Nottingham
Dewar Cup Finals
Dewar Cup Perth
Dewar Cup Port Talbot
Dewar Cup Stalybridge
Dewar Cup Torquay

References

External links
https://thetennisbase.com/Aberavon Results
https://thetennisbase.com/Perth Results
http://www.tennisarchives.com/1969 Perth Result
https://thetennisbase.com/Stalybridge results

Defunct tennis tournaments in the United Kingdom
Defunct tennis tours